The 1936 Vanderbilt Cup (formally known as I  George Vanderbilt Cup) was a Grand Prix that was held on 12 October 1936 at Roosevelt Raceway near Westbury, Long Island, New York City, USA. It was the fourth and last race of the 1936 AAA Championship Car season, not counting the non-championship events. The race, contested over 75 laps of 6.39 km (3.97 mi), was won by Tazio Nuvolari driving a Alfa Romeo 12C-36 after starting from eighth position.

Background
For the history of the Vanderbilt Cup: see Vanderbilt Cup

This was the first time that the Vanderbilt Cup was held since 1916. George Washington Vanderbilt III, the nephew of the founder of the Vanderbilt Cup, William Kissam Vanderbilt II, sponsored a 300-mile race (480 km) in 1936 at Roosevelt Raceway. Just like in the original races, European drivers were enticed by the substantial prize money - Scuderia Ferrari entered three Alfa Romeo racers. However, because of little American competition and an unexciting course layout, the race was organised for only two years. Both races were won by Europeans. After 1937, the Vanderbilt Cup would not be raced until 1960.

Sources:The Golden Era of Grand prix Racing - I George Vanderbilt Cup RaceVanderbilt Cup Races - Race Profile: 1936 Vanderbilt Cup Race

Entries

 DNA = Did Not Arrive
 DNS = Did Not Start
 DNQ = Did Not Qualify

Sources:ChampCarStats.com - 1936 George Vanderbilt CupThe Golden Era of Grand prix Racing - I George Vanderbilt Cup Race

Grid positions

Sources:ChampCarStats.com - 1936 George Vanderbilt CupVanderbilt Cup Races - Starting Lineup for the 1936 Vanderbilt Cup RaceThe Golden Era of Grand Prix Racing - I George Vanderbilt Cup Race

Race results
Twelve of the forty-five drivers that started the race were Europeans driving an English ERA, a French Bugatti or an Italian Alfa Romeo or Maserati. The rest of the field was made up of Americans in dirt track cars with two-speed gearboxes. Although the course contained only one long straight, and the European drivers had to get used to the loose dirt track surface, the Americans were no contest for the Grand Prix cars. For example, even with Nuvolari's V12 Alfa Romeo running on eleven cylinders, he won by eight minutes on Wimille. The best American driver was Cummings finishing seventh almost twenty-five minutes behind the winner.

 DNF = Did Not Finish
 DSQ = Disqualified

Sources: see Entries

Sources
 ChampCarStats.com - 1936 George Vanderbilt Cup
 www.kolumbus.fi - I George Vanderbilt Cup Race
 Vanderbilt Cup Races - Exclusive: Starting Lineup for the 1936 Vanderbilt Cup Race
 Vanderbilt Cup Races - Race Profile: 1936 Vanderbilt Cup Race
 Driver Database - The page of each aforementioned driver was consulted.
 Racing Sports Cars - The page of each aforementioned driver was consulted.
 YouTube - 1936 Vanderbilt Cup Race
 Vanderbilt Cup Races - 1936 Vanderbilt Cup Race: Photos from the Nassau County Division of Museum Services
 Vanderbilt Cup Races - Spectacular Aerials of Roosevelt Field and Roosevelt Raceway (1924-1938)
 www.kolumbus.fi - Roosevelt Raceway, New York (USA)

1936 in American motorsport
1936 in American sports
Vanderbilt Cup
Vanderbilt Cup
Motorsport in New York (state)